Beaver Dam Raceway is a one-third mile banked clay oval track located in Beaver Dam, Wisconsin, U.S.A. The track holds weekly races over the Northern American summer months. It hosts an annual World of Outlaws sprint car races. The 2013 U.S. Dirt Legends Nationals event was held at the track. The World of Outlaws Late Model Series added an event in 2020. It has held midget car events on the POWRi Midget Racing and USAC National Midgets national tours.

Divisions
This track has an average of 90 to 110 cars participating in every Saturday night race with some specials on holidays and weekdays. The current weekly divisions are modifieds, grand nationals, Legends, sport modifieds, and street stocks. Well-known race car drivers, such as Kasey Kahne, (currently in NASCAR), Kenny Schrader, Tony Stewart, Josh Wise (all retired from NASCAR) and Steve Kinser (also retired from NASCAR), have competed here. Drivers from the United States, Canada, and other countries have competed at Beaver Dam Raceway - including Japan and Australia. The current track record is 11.025 seconds, set by Sheldon Haudenschild on June 17th, 2022. The track also features a 1/5th mile Go-Kart track in the infield, which runs on Tuesday nights.

History

The modern track opened on May 29, 1993, operating through 1998, and reopening in 2000. Its alternative names are Powercom Park Raceway, The Raceway at Powercom Park, Charter Raceway Park, Wisconsin Motorsports Park and Raceway Park. The track held a World of Outlaws sprint car event from 1996 to 1998, and from 2002 until the present, and have also held multiple World of Outlaws Late Model events. The track hosts legends cars and held the 2013 U.S. Dirt Legends Nationals in October.

A fatality occurred at the track September 20, 2014 when the IRA Outlaw Sprint Series driver Scott Semmelmann flipped his car during a practice. The 410 sprint car tour event was canceled.

On June 23, 2018, another fatal incident occurred when former Knoxville Nationals champion Jason Johnson crashed on lap 18 while racing for the lead in the World of Outlaws series A-main. The car made contact with another car and tumbled violently into the Turn 3 billboards.

Past Champions

World of Outlaws Sprint Cars A-Feature Winners

* First career Outlaws win

References

External links

Beaver Dam Raceway official website
Interstate Racing Association (IRA)
World of Outlaws

1993 establishments in Wisconsin
1998 disestablishments in Wisconsin
2000 establishments in Wisconsin
Buildings and structures in Dodge County, Wisconsin
Motorsport venues in Wisconsin
Articles containing video clips
Sports venues completed in 1993
Sports in the Milwaukee metropolitan area